The National Guard is the Mexican national gendarmerie force,  created in 2019 with national police functions. The National Guard was formed by absorbing units and officers from the Federal Police, Military Police, and Naval Police. A reform package approved in the Mexican Congress has made the transfer of the National Guard to the direct command of the Mexican Army official.

History

The National Guard was launched by President Andrés Manuel López Obrador in 2019. It has since played a major part in intensifying the enforcement of immigration policy. Before becoming president, López Obrador campaigned on a promise to take the military off the streets. Shortly after assuming office, he released a plan to create the National Guard under control of the Mexican Armed Forces which would be in charge of "preventing and combating crime". López Obrador stated that the new National Guard would be critical to solving Mexico's ongoing security crisis.

On 28 February, Congress voted to approve a 60,000-member national guard. On 27 May 2019, the law regulating the National Guard entered into force. On 30 June 2019, the National Guard was officially established.

In June 2019, as part of a deal with the United States, Mexico agreed to deploy the newly formed National Guard to its border with Guatemala. While the guard was always intended to enforce immigration policy, it was not intended to do so as soon as announced.

A 2019 survey sponsored by The Washington Post and Mexican newspaper Reforma gathered information on public opinion regarding both the new National Guard and illegal immigration to Mexico. The survey was conducted from 9 July to 14 July 2019, among 1,200 adults across the country in 100 election districts by way of face-to-face interviews. A 53% majority voiced their trust in the national guard, with two-thirds saying that they would like the national guard to be in their city, whereas 45% report that they feel more safe with the domestic force. Furthermore, the survey said 51% of Mexicans support utilizing the country's recently formed National Guard to repel migration by illegal immigrants.

Command structure 
The law assigns full control of the National Guard to the Secretary of Security and Civilian Protection, who is in charge of all matters related to the work of the NG.

According to article 12 of the Law of the National Guard, the National Guard is organized on five command levels:
 Secretary of Security and Civilian Protection
 Operational Commander
 Territorial Coordinator
 State Coordinator
 Unit Coordinator

Ranks 
According to articles 29 and 30 of the Law of the National Guard, the ranks are:

Commissioned officers

Basic scale ladder

See also 
Fourth Transformation
Federal Police (Mexico)
Illegal immigration to Mexico

References

External links 
 

Military units and formations established in 2019
Military of Mexico
Federal law enforcement agencies of Mexico
Gendarmerie